Emilio Cruz may refer to:

 Emilio Cruz (cyclist) (born 1936), Spanish racing cyclist
 Emilio Cruz (artist) (1938–2004), American artist
 Emilio Cruz (footballer) (born 1953), Spanish footballer and football manager